Maggie Simpson in "The Force Awakens from Its Nap", known simply as The Force Awakens from Its Nap is an animated short film based on the television series The Simpsons. The short was released on May 4, 2021, on Disney+ in celebration of Star Wars Day.

It is the third short film featuring Maggie Simpson, following The Longest Daycare (2012) and Playdate with Destiny (2020). This promotional short is the first of several from The Simpsons that Disney+ released throughout 2021, to tie in with the service's marquee brands and titles.

Plot 
Marge drives Maggie to The Ayn Rand School for Tots daycare, but Maggie refuses, so she takes her to the Jabba's Hut Jedi Preschool, entering through the Sky toddlers door. In there, they see a Jedi prepare sandwiches with the use of a lightsaber and the force, while Ahsoka Tano puts a baby in carbonite for being bad.

Marge takes her to General Grievous that was changing a kid's diaper next to R2-D2, using it as a trash bin. The cyborg takes the pacifier and throws it away. Maggie panics and is approached by BB-8, which wants to help her retrieve the pacifier, so Maggie gives it her bow tie.

BB-8 starts running toward the next room but finds itself trapped in the middle of many other BB-8s. Maggie tries to reach it but the other BB-8 attack and damage it. BB-8 managed to find and give Maggie the pacifier before Baby Gerald, dressed as Darth Maul, stabs it in the back.

Maggie and Gerald start fighting, Maggie using a prolonged pacifier, and when she reaches a "new improved Death Star guaranteed unexplodable" she hits it, making it explode on Gerald. However, he's not stopped and makes her lose the pacifier. Maggie quickly retrieves it and makes him lose his diaper.

Not losing a beat, Gerald uses the Force to crush her under a wardrobe. BB-8, still alive, arrives at the scene, and Maggie emerges from the wardrobe, alive, with Yoda ears. BB-8 wonders how she's alive and she shows it how in the Star Wars rules, beloved characters never really die. In the end, Maggie and a restored BB-8 watch the twin suns of Tatooine set.

Production
The idea behind a Star Wars short starring Maggie Simpson came up in January 2021. As the Disney+ Simpsons library was well received, executive producer James L. Brooks proposed to do a series of shorts where the show interacted with other franchises available in the streaming service. Showrunner Al Jean, a long-time Star Wars fan, pitched the idea of making a Star Wars-centric short in which Maggie is sent to a Jedi preschool. Two shorts starring Maggie, The Longest Daycare and Playdate with Destiny, had been previously produced in 2012 and 2020. Both Lucasfilm Ltd. and Disney+ showed enthusiasm for the idea, and asked the Simpsons crew to have the short ready for May 4, 2021, given how "Star Wars Day" is celebrated on that date.

Jean wrote the script along with Joel Cohen and Mike Price and the Simpsons director David Silverman directed the short. The first draft for the short was ready by January 18. They worked closely with Lucasfilm throughout the short's development, providing suggestions and making sure that the Simpsons crew used the full universe of their characters. Among the characters included in the short as a "Darth Maul Baby" and BB-8, but Grogu (better known as "Baby Yoda") was only referenced yet not included, as Jean felt that the character is probably the most sought-after of Disney, so they did not want him to be overexposed. The Lucasfilm team also helped them to transliterate the chalkboard writing to Aurebesh. The short was finished on April 30, four days before its release date.

Reception

Critical reception 
Rich Knight of Cinema Blend ranked Maggie Simpson in "The Force Awakens from Its Nap" third in their top of The Simpsons Short, acknowledged the references to the Star Wars franchise, and praised the humor and the gags of the animated short film, despite stating that The Force Awakens from Its Nap does not offer much of a story. Eden Arnold of Bleeding Cool found the short film to be an endearing celebration of Star Wars Day, while saying it shows off Disney's properties. Raul Velasquez of TheGamer.com complimented the humor of the short film, stating it manages to be a cheerful and carefree short that is funny enough to entertain Star Wars fans, and claimed that the crossover manages to capture the humor of The Simpsons franchise at the same time.

John Schwarz of Bubbleblabber gave The Force Awakens from Its Nap a nine out of ten stating "The David Silverman-directed short was partly written by Michael Price which is a perfect choice given that the longtime producer for The Simpsons is also a Star Wars encyclopedia having done other parodies for different networks. With Marvel’s What If? coming in August, there’s already talk of there being a Marvel crossover with The Simpsons similar to this, and with this being very well done, fans should be excited about the limitless opportunities the co-productions can bring to the table."

Accolades

References

External links

2020s American animated films
2021 animated films
2021 short films
American animated short films
American comedy short films
Animated films based on animated series
Animated films without speech
Disney+ original films
Films based on television series
Films directed by David Silverman
Films set in the United States
Parody films based on Star Wars
The Simpsons short films
20th Century Studios short films
Gracie Films films
2020s Disney animated short films
Films produced by James L. Brooks
Films produced by Matt Groening